Olga Vittoria Gentilli (19 July 1888 – 29 May 1957) was an Italian stage and film actress. She appeared in around forty films during the Fascist era and immediate post-war years. She generally played supporting roles in films such as Naples of Olden Times (1938).

Selected filmography
 Together in the Dark (1933)
 Adam's Tree (1936)
 To Live (1937)
 The Two Misanthropists (1937)
 Naples of Olden Times (1938)
 Captain Fracasse (1940)
 Eternal Melodies (1940)
 Teresa Venerdì (1941)
 Tosca (1941)
 Honeymoon (1941)
 The Adventuress from the Floor Above (1941)
 A Garibaldian in the Convent (1942)
 The Peddler and the Lady (1943)
 Two Hearts (1943)
 The Tyrant of Padua (1946)
 Baron Carlo Mazza (1948)
 Son of the Hunchback (1952)

References

External links

Bibliography
 Landy, Marcia. Italian Film.  Cambridge University Press, 2000.

1888 births
1957 deaths
Italian film actresses
Italian stage actresses
19th-century Neapolitan people
20th-century Italian actresses